No Way (stylized as NO WAY)  is female duo Soulhead's ninth single and released on March 24, 2004. The single charted low on Oricon at #50 for the daily ranking, before falling off the charts.

Information
Keeping up with their signature, No Way was also released on both CD and vinyl. No Way was a smooth R&B track, while the b-side, D.O.G, was hip-hop-inspired.

The title track's lyrics were written by Soulhead and arranged by both the female duo and Octopussy. The lyrics to No Way are about not wanting to fight with a boyfriend and regretting the argument, which ultimately had the boyfriend leave.

An "album version" of D.O.G was later released on their corresponding album, Braided in place of the version placed on the single.

Track listing

CD
(Source)
"No Way"
"D.O.G"
"No Way" (Instrumental)
"D.O.G" (Instrumental)

12" Vinyl
Side A
"No Way"
"No Way" (Instrumental)
"No Way" (A Capella)

Side B
"D.O.G"
"D.O.G" (Instrumental)
"D.O.G" (A Capella)

References

2004 singles
Sony Music Entertainment Japan singles